The following are the winners of the 43rd annual (2016) Origins Award, presented at Origins 2017:

Fan Favorites

Hall of Fame inductees
Mike Elliott and Jennell Jaquays

References

External links
 Origins Awards Winners  2017 – 43rd Annual Ceremony

2016 awards
2016 awards in the United States